Qazıqumlaq (also, Kazykumlak and Kazykumlakh) is a village and municipality in the Ujar Rayon of Azerbaijan.  It has a population of 4,147.

References 

Populated places in Ujar District